Wayne Price is a former professional strongman competitor from South Africa. Wayne was a finalist in the 1995 World's Strongest Man contest, and was South Africa's Strongest Man in 1991. Gary Taylor was a close friend and training partner of Wayne's in the 1990s

In 2001, Wayne joined the MTN Gladiators series, serving as its referee.

References 

Living people
South African strength athletes
Year of birth missing (living people)